Canthium angustifolium, with the common name narrow-leaved canthium, is native to southern tropical Asia.

The large shrub is found in eastern India (including Assam), Bangladesh, and Myanmar (former Burma).

References

External links

angustifolium
Flora of the Indian subcontinent
Flora of Myanmar
Plants described in 1824